Navah Wolfe is a two-time Hugo Award winning American editor of science fiction, fantasy and horror works.

Biography

Navah Wolfe went to college at Yeshiva University where she studied History and English. She won the Hugo Award for Best Editor (Long Form) in 2019 and 2020, having been nominated in 2017, 2018, 2021 and 2022. She has worked with some significant names in science fiction, fantasy and horror, her genre specialties for the past twelve years or more. She is currently an Executive Editor at DAW Books. In the past, she has worked as an editor at Subterranean Press, Saga Press and Simon & Schuster Books for Young Readers. Wolfe has worked with Dominik Parisien to create a series of anthologies which have won Shirley Jackson Awards as well as being finalists for the World and British Fantasy Award. She lives in Connecticut with her husband and four children.

Awards and nominations
Navah Wolfe won the Hugo for Best Editor (Long Form) in 2020 and 2019, and was a finalist for the award in 2017, 2018, 2021 and 2022.

Wolfe was also a finalist for the Locus Award for Best Editor in 2017, 2018, 2019 and 2020.

Her anthologies The Starlit Wood and Robots VS Fairies  (co-edited with Dominik Parisien) both won the Shirley Jackson Award. Their anthology The Mythic Dream was a finalist for the Shirley Jackson Award as well. All three anthologies were finalists for the World Fantasy Award and Locus Awards.

Wolfe has worked on books that have won the Hugo Award, Nebula Award, Lambda Literary Award, BSFA Award, Aurora Award, and been finalists for the Locus Award, Bram Stoker Award, World Fantasy Award, and all other major industry awards.

Anthologies with Dominik Parisien
 The Starlit Wood (2016), winner of the Shirley Jackson Award, finalist for the World Fantasy Award, British Fantasy Award and Locus Award.
 Robots Vs. Fairies (2018) winner of the Shirley Jackson Award, finalist for the World Fantasy Award and Locus Award.
 The Mythic Dream (2019) finalist for the Shirley Jackson Award, World Fantasy Award and Locus Award.

Authors and works

Wolfe has worked with many authors, including:

 Amal El-Mohtar
 Max Gladstone
 Rivers Solomon
 Daveed Diggs
 Catherynne M. Valente
 Elizabeth Bear
 Theodora Goss
 Ursula Vernon
 Alexandra Rowland
 Mishell Baker
 Rachel Neumeier
 Cassandra Rose Clarke
 Kay Kenyon
 Genevieve Valentine
 Matt Wallace
 Jonathan Maberry
 Neal Shusterman
 Tim Federle
 Katherine Rundell
 Benjamin Alire Saenz
 Margaret Peterson Haddix

References and sources

Year of birth missing (living people)
American editors
American book editors
Science fiction editors
Yeshiva University alumni
People from Connecticut
Living people
Women speculative fiction editors